Eduard de Muralt ( Bischofszell 1808–1895) was a Swiss-German professor of theology, librarian, and palaeographer.

Born in Bischofszell, as son of Kaspar, a dealer, and of Elizabeth Sprüngli. Studies of theology in Zurich (finished in 1832), then of philology and philosophy in Berlin, Jena and Paris. Muralt emigrated to Russia in 1834, took the German Protestant parish of St. Petersburg (1836-1850), he was a librarian of the Imperial Hermitage (1840-1864), and described Greek manuscripts housed in the library. He examined also the Codex Vaticanus in the Vatican Library.

He became private-docent in the University of Bern (1864), and professor of theology in Lausanne (1869). Doctor honoris causa of the faculty of theology of the University of Zurich (1849).

Works 
 Catalogue des manuscrits grecs de la Bibliothèque Impériale publique (Petersburg 1864)

References

External links 
 Dictionnaire historique de la Suisse (DHS)

1808 births
1895 deaths
People from Weinfelden District
Swiss biblical scholars
Swiss librarians
Swiss palaeographers